Khentii is one of the 21 aimags (provinces) of Mongolia, located in the east of the country. Its capital is Chinggis City. The aimag is named after the Khentii Mountains.  It is best known as the birthplace and likely final resting place of Temüjin, otherwise known as Genghis Khan.

Geography 
The aimag borders with Russia in the north. The neighbouring aimags are Selenge in the northwest, Töv in the west, Govisümber in the southwest, Dornogovi in the south, Sükhbaatar in the southeast, and Dornod in the east. The border to Töv is divided by the city of Baganuur, an administrative exclave of Ulaanbaatar.

The northwest of the aimag is covered by the eastern part of the Khentii Mountains, towards the southeast the landscape changes into the eastern Mongolian steppe plains. The mountain Burkhan Khaldun in the Khan Khentii Strictly Protected Area is considered sacred and assumed to be the birthplace of Genghis Khan.

South of Burkhan Khaldun the Kherlen River originates, which crosses the south of the aimag in the eastern direction after a detour through Töv. A little further east is the spring of the Onon River. The Onon-Balj National Park is located in the northeast of the aimag.

Population

Administrative subdivisions 

* - including Berkh.
** - including Bor-Öndör.
*** - including The aimag capital Chinggis.

References 

 
Provinces of Mongolia
States and territories established in 1930
1930 establishments in Asia